Kyawswa I of Pinya (1299–1350) was king of Pinya from 1344 to 1350. His six-year reign briefly restored unity in southern Upper Burma although his authority over his southernmost vassals remained largely nominal. He suddenly died in 1350, and came to be regarded as one of the major Burmese folk spirits, known as Nga-zi Shin Nat.

Early life
Born in 1299, Kyawswa was the elder son of Queen Mi Saw U of Pagan and Thihathu, Co-Regent of Myinsaing. He grew up at the Pinle Palace with his younger brother Nawrahta; three half-siblings Uzana, Saw Yun, and Saw Pale; and one stepbrother Tarabya. Kyawswa grew up as second in the line of succession after Uzana. (Eager to be seen as a legitimate successor to the Pagan line, Thihathu ranked his stepson Uzana, of Pagan royalty from both sides, first; and Kyawswa, of Pagan royalty the maternal side, second.)

Governor of Pinle (1313–25)
On 7 February 1313, Kyawswa was appointed governor of Pinle by Thihathu who had become the sole ruler of Myinsaing, later known as the Pinya Kingdom. The governorship of his father's old fief was second only in importance behind Thihathu's appointment of Uzana as heir-apparent. (Thihathu's other children did not get any appointments.) While the governorship was likely a titular title in the beginning, by 1315, Kyawswa like Uzana was given command of his own military units (1000 shielded infantry, 80 cavalry, 10 elephants).

In 1316–17, Kyawswa became ensnared in palace succession intrigues. The king asked Kyawswa to retake Sagaing which Saw Yun had fortified after unsatisfied with what the prince perceived to be a second-class status. When Kyawswa got the order, Uzana had already tried, and failed. But Kyawswa's expedition too failed. The king seemed halfhearted about punishing Saw Yun, and did not mobilize all his forces. Uzana and Kyawswa had march with their own small army, separately. But when Toungoo (Taungoo) revolted in 1317, Thihathu asked both Uzana and Kyawswa with a combined army to march to Toungoo. The two brothers got Toungoo's ruler Thawun Nge to submit.

The Sagaing affair remained unresolved. It is unclear if Sagaing could have been taken if Thihathu ordered a larger expedition as he did with Toungoo. But the king accepted Saw Yun's nominal submission, and did not again order another attack. Though Uzana remained the official crown prince, Saw Yun was already the de facto ruler of the northern country. Thihathu was resigned to the fact that his kingdom would be split into two after his death.

Viceroy of Pinle (1325–44)
As Thihathu feared, the Pinya kingdom formally separated into two at his death in 1325. Uzana's rump Pinya Kingdom ruled the eastern and southern Central Burma while Saw Yun's Sagaing Kingdom ruled the northern and western parts. Kyawswa did not openly challenge Uzana. But he continued to have his own army and conducted his own policy. Indeed, it was Kyawswa, who famously ordered his commander Khin Nyo to assassinate Saw Yun. The assassination attempt did not succeed but Kyawswa turned his attention to the control of Pinya in the following years. Both he and Uzana maintained separate specialized military units (shielded infantry, cavalry, war elephants) around their core region of Kyaukse.

The brothers' rivalry greatly limited Pinya's effective power. Its southernmost vassals were practically independent, and had to fend for themselves. Pinya took no action with the 1325 assassination of Saw Hnit, the Pinya-recognized ruler of Toungoo. Nor did it take any action when Ramanya attacked Prome (Pyay) in 1330, or when Arakan attacked Thayet in 1334.

The rivalry came to a head in 1340. Kyawswa had collected five white elephants, considered auspicious symbols of Burmese monarchs. Instead of handing them over to his overlord Uzana, he kept them. Uzana asked for them twice. Both times, Kyawswa refused, and sent two regular elephants instead.

The refusals signaled war. Uzana ultimately backed down, and looked for a face-saving way out. The king handed over the power to Gov. Sithu of Myinsaing, uncle and father-in-law of Kyawswa, on 1 September 1340, and became a monk at Mekkhaya. Father-in-law or not, Kyawswa apparently did not recognize Sithu either. According to an inscription donated on 17 June 1342 by Kyawswa's chief queen consort Atula Sanda Dewi, Kyawswa had already claimed himself king. A contemporary inscription shows that Kyawswa became the undisputed ruler of Pinya on 29 March 1344.

King of Pinya (1344–50)
Kyawswa's the reign name was Pawara Pandita Thihathura Dhamma Yaza but was popularly known as Nga-zi Shin ("Lord of Five White Elephants"). The new king quickly consolidated his hold over the core region of Kyaukse and its periphery. He was able to buy off his potential rivals by using bribery, flattery and indeed the threat of force. He appeased his younger brother Nawrahta by appointing the latter governor of Pinle, his old job. He also successfully persuaded Uzana's younger son Gov. Thihapate of Yamethin not to revolt. However, his hold over the southernmost vassals was still limited. Prome under Pinya-appointed Gov. Saw Yan Naung remained calm but more remote Toungoo was another matter. Within the first three years of Kyawswa's accession, two Toungoo rulers were assassinated. Kyawswa had to be satisfied with the nominal submission by the usurpers.

Outside of Toungoo, the kingdom was largely peaceful. He successfully reunified Pinya's military corps in the core region. An avid horse rider, the king formed elite cavalry and shielded infantry units. He not only liked to review military parades but also take part in the military dances of elite shielded units while singing military songs. He appointed his second son Kyawswa II his heir-apparent (over the eldest son Uzana who had weak or paralyzed legs). The appointment apparently did not go well with his brother Nawrahta, who defected to Sagaing in 1349. The king built the Lay-Myet-Hna Pagada in Pinya. He also commissioned a study of the state of the Buddhist clergy but the court fearing his wrath left out the corruption of the so-called monks from the report.

The king died on 12 December 1350. According to tradition, he suddenly fell ill, and died in his 9th year of reign. He is said to have become a nat (spirit) with the name Nga-zi Shin Nat. He is still venerated as one of the Outer Thirty Seven Spirits.

Family
Kyawswa had four sons and four daughters by his two principal queens consort. He also had at least one junior queen, Saw Gyi, daughter of Gov. Sithu of Myinsaing.

Chronicle reporting differences
The royal chronicles do not necessarily agree on his birth, death, and reign dates.

Ancestry

Notes

References

Bibliography
 
 
 
 
 
 
 
 
 
 
 
 

Myinsaing dynasty
Pinya dynasty
11
1299 births
1350 deaths
14th-century Burmese monarchs